This is a list of public art in Denbighshire in north-east Wales. Denbighshire's borders were established in 1996 under the Local Government (Wales) Act 1994 and differ from those of the historic county of the same name. This list applies only to works of public art on permanent display in an outdoor public space and does not, for example, include artworks in museums.

Betws Gwerfil Goch

Bodelwyddan

Bodfari

Carrog

Corwen

Denbigh

Glyndyfrdwy

Llangollen

Prestatyn

Rhuddlan

Rhyl

Ruthin

St Asaph

References

Denbighshire
Denbighshire